Voiceprint can refer to the spectrogram of a voice. More specific uses include:
 VoicePrint, as of March 2012 now AMI-audio, Canada's broadcast reading service
 Voiceprint Records, an English record label
 The stored template used to identify a person via their voice in speaker recognition